Jason C. Cherubini is an American film producer, business professor, and consultant. He is a visiting professor at Nordakademie.

Early life and education 
Cherubini received a Bachelor of Science in Management, a Master of Business Administration, and Master of Accounting degrees from the A.B. Freeman School of Business at Tulane University in New Orleans. He is also a Certified Public Accountant, Certified Management Accountant, and a Chartered Global Management Accountant.

Career 
After completing his master's degrees, Cherubini worked as a financial and operations consultant, founding Seraphim Associates in Washington, DC, USA. He began teaching college courses at Loyola College and Marymount University, eventually taking the position of Assistant Professor of Business at Goucher College. He continues to hold the faculty position of Visiting Professor at Nordakademie in Hamburg, Germany. In 2014, he co-founded Dawn's Light Media with Richard Switzer and serves as the Chief Financial Officer.

Publications

User-Oriented IFRS Education in Introductory Accounting at U.S. Academic Institutions: Current Status and Influencing Factors Hong Zhu; Kevin T. Rich; Alfred R. Michenzi; Jason Cherubini Issues in Accounting Education (2011) 26 (4): 725–750.
IFRS in introductory financial accounting using an integrated, comparison-based approach / Kevin T. Rich, Jason C. Cherubini, Hong Zhu Publication date 2012 Advances in accounting education ; 13, 1085-4622 
IFRS in the General Business Curriculum: Why Should We Care?, Feb, 13, PER, Education Cherubini, Jason, Kevin Rich, Hong Zhu, and Alfred Michenzi 
Emotional labor in the liberal arts Emotional intelligence : current evidence from psychophysiological, educational and organizational perspectives Janine L. Bowen and Jason C. Cherubini

Filmography

References

External links 
https://www.jasoncherubini.com
https://www.linkedin.com/in/jasoncherubini
https://www.imdb.me/jasoncherubini

Living people
Tulane University alumni
American management consultants
Goucher College faculty and staff
American business writers
1981 births